Sin at-tamyiz (the "age of discernment") refers to the age at which a child is able to care for him or herself, no longer requiring adult assistance to eat, dress, or clean themselves.  Although it is generally seen as varying individually, Abu Hanifah, founder of the Hanafi school of Islamic jurisprudence, states that it is nine years for a girl and seven for a boy.  Following divorce, Islamic fiqh generally prescribes that the mother maintains sole custody of a child prior to this age.

See also 
 Baligh/Bulugh
 Age of reason (canon law), the parallel concept in Catholic Christianity

References 
"Sin at-Tamyiz" at the USC-CRCC Compendium of Muslim Texts

Arabic words and phrases in Sharia
Islamic terminology